The Landsverk L-185 was Swedish armored car, developed by AB Landsverk in 1933. The L-185 wasn't used by the Swedish Army. In 1934, a modified L-185, built on a 4 x 4 Fordson chassis, was sold to Denmark, being 2.5 tons heavier than the original and it was issued to the Army Technical Corps of the Danish Army, under the Danish designation FP-6. Following an engine failure in the 1937, the L-185  was relegated to the training role in 1939.

See also
Landsverk L-180, L-181 and L-182 — A family of similar armored cars made by Landsverk.

Notes

External links
 Landsverk – Site about AB Landsverk between 1850 and 1992. (Swedish language)
 Danish armor – Web page dedicated to the Danish armor.

Armoured cars of the interwar period
Military vehicles introduced in the 1930s
Armoured fighting vehicles of Sweden